Frank Percy Hart (22 August 1860 – 27 October 1945) was an Australian politician.

He was born in Launceston. In 1916 he was elected to the Tasmanian Legislative Council as the independent member for Launceston. He served until his defeat in 1940. Hart died in Launceston in 1945.

References

1860 births
1945 deaths
Independent members of the Parliament of Tasmania
Members of the Tasmanian Legislative Council